The Dorothy Hill Medal is awarded annually and honours the contributions of the late Professor Dorothy Hill to Australian Earth science and her work in opening up tertiary science education to women.

The award supports research in the Earth sciences by female researchers up to 10 years post doctorate for research carried out mainly in Australia.

Prior to 2018 the award was known as the Dorothy Hill Award.

Recipients
Source: Australian Academy of Science

See also

 List of earth sciences awards

References

Earth sciences awards
Australian Academy of Science Awards
Australian science and technology awards
Awards established in 2002
Science awards honoring women